John Blue House may refer to:

 John Blue House (Aberdeen, North Carolina), listed on the NRHP in Moore County, North Carolina
 John Blue House (Laurinburg, North Carolina), listed on the NRHP in North Carolina

See also
Blue House (disambiguation)